Hypogrammodes is a genus of moths of the family Noctuidae. The genus was erected by George Hampson in 1913.

Species
Hypogrammodes aeolia H. Druce, 1890
Hypogrammodes balma Guenée, 1852
Hypogrammodes confusa Butler, 1878
Hypogrammodes feronia Felder, 1874
Hypogrammodes glaucoides Schaus, 1906
Hypogrammodes micropis Hampson, 1913
Hypogrammodes ocellata Maassen, 1890
Hypogrammodes subocellata Schaus, 1906

References

Catocalinae